Thyagarajanagar is one of the oldest localities in Bengaluru. It is part of Basavanagudi in South Bengaluru. The area has several religious temples.

Transport
The area is well connected by Bengaluru Metropolitan Transport Corporation. Metro available at jayanagar metro station . 20 mins walk from Thyagarajanagar. BMTC: From majestic 210P,210N, 31E

Location

Neighbourhoods in Bangalore